Flight 180 (first known as 180 or One Eighty) was an American Christian ska band, with punk and swing influences, from Orange County, California. Fronted by Kim Tennberg, singer and songwriter, they formed in 1998 and disbanded in 2001, releasing three albums with BEC Recordings: Crackerjack (1998), Lineup (1999) and Girls and Boys (2001). Members Kim Tennberg, Chris Tennberg, Jamin Boggs and Josh Brisby continued to tour and record music independently after the third album was released.

Background
The band formed in Orange County, California, in 1999. Their members were Kim Tennberg (lead vocals, trumpet and songwriter), Madelyn Mendoza (vocals and percussion), Jerry Elekes (lead guitar), Chris Tennberg (rhythm guitar), Dave Des Armier (bass guitar), Jamin Boggs (drums), Josh Brisby (trombone) and John Anderson (tenor saxophone). They disbanded as a group, in 2001.

The group was formed in 1998, with their major label released studio album, Crackerjack by BEC Recordings, on November 3, 1998. Line Up was released on September 14, 1999 and Girls and Boys, was released on February 27, 2001, by BEC Recordings.

Members
source:
 Kim Tennberg - lead vocals, songwriter, trumpet
 Madelyn Mendoza -  vocals, percussion
 Jerry Elekes - lead guitar
 Chris Tennberg - rhythm guitar
 Dave Des Armier - bass
 Jamin Boggs - drums
 Josh Brisby - trombone
 John Anderson - tenor saxophone

Discography
Studio albums
 Crackerjack (November 3, 1998, BEC)
 Lineup (September 14, 1999, BEC)
 Girls and Boys (February 27, 2001, BEC)

References

External links
 Facebook page
 Cross Rhythms artist profile
 New Release Tuesday artist profile

Musical groups established in 1998
Musical groups disestablished in 2001
Musical groups from Orange County, California
BEC Recordings artists